Mostafa Abdollahi (1955 – ) was a seminal Iranian stage and film actor, theater director, voice artist and theater instructor. He was widely recognized as an outstanding actor and the many productions that he directed provided him with a reputation as one of the leading theater directors in Iran. In 1979, he was admitted to the dramatic arts faculty of Tehran to start his education in the directing and acting program.

Abdollahi established Koocheh (meaning alley in English) theater group in his birthplace in 1970. During 46 years of activity, he staged numerous plays both as an actor and as a director. He also acted in many movies, TV theaters, Radio dramas, and TV series.

His artistic activities include acting and directing in 62 theater productions, directing several TV theaters and short films, directing and voice acting in more than 500 radio plays, and playing in famous TV series like Heroes Never Die, Lighter Than Darkness, and Zero Degree Turn. Abdollahi is also the recipient of many awards for various artistic activities.

Biography 
Born in 1955 in the city of Borujerd, Abdollahi passed his childhood and teenage years in his birthplace. He established Koocheh theater group in 1970. Koocheh theater, which was the first scientific and organized theater in Borujerd, announced its existence by performing the Farmer of Chicago by Mark Twain. Activity of Koocheh theater group in borujerd lasted until 1979. During 9 years, the members of Koocheh theater group performed 17 plays from famous Iranian and western playwrights such as Bahram Beyzai, Athol Fugard, William Shakespeare, Gholam-Hossein Sa'edi, and Augusta, Lady Gregory.

After starting his studies at the Dramatic Arts Faculty of Tehran, Abdollahi was selected to play a small role in a play titled Enemies written by Maxim Gorky and directed by maestro Rokneddin Khosravi. Within the rehearsal sessions, his virtuosity and endeavor caused Khosravi to choose him for Zakarov role, which is one of the leading roles in Enemies. This play, however, was not performed because of the so-called cultural revolution and its sequences in Iran. Iranian cultural revolution caused universities to be closed, therefore Abdollahi voluntarily went to Kerman province to help earthquake-stricken people and collaborated in rebuilding damaged towns. Because of universities reopening in Iran by the end of the cultural revolution, he came back to Tehran and prepared Sizwe Banzi is dead as the graduation thesis of his classmate Majid Beheshti. His brilliant performance attracted Hamid Samandarian's and Ghotbeddin Sadeghi's attentions who were two outstanding directors in Iran.

Abdollahi was one of the first artists invited to join Honar theater group which was established by Ghotbeddin Sadeghi. He collaborated with Honar theater group as the director and actor in more than 25 plays. During 90's, the acting duo Mostafa Abdollahi and Michael Shahrestani was very famous and admirable in Iranian theater. 

Many people know Abdollahi for his playing the role of an Iranian hero named Arsalan in the Heroes Never Die TV series. Abdollahi started his acting in Iran television since 1986. He also participated in several movies such as Living with the presence of a wall, Eye witness, and Mah-banoo. Moreover, Abdollahi had many successful experiences in acting and directing dramas for Iran national radio and television. By and large, he was recognized as a prominent artist in Iran and as Ghotbeddin Sadeghi said: "He never staged dull and useless plays, which are far from the culture of his homeland and he had faith in what he did on stage".

Having a critical approach towards the domestic affairs in Iran, Mostafa Abdollahi profoundly tried to introduce salient western playwrights to the Iranian society. For Instance, he was the first Iranian producer who directed a play by Pavel Kohout titled War on the third floor. Abdollahi also introduced famous Russian writer Nikolai Erdman to Iranian audience by staging The mandate. After performing Accidental death of an anarchist, a play written by Dari Fo, Koocheh theater group founded by Abdollahi was recognized the best theater group in Iran in 2013. While having his last play, The lower depths written by Maxim Gorky, on the stage of the main hall of the Tehran City Theater Complex, he died in Tehran on 21 May 2015 after 14 years of suffering from blood cancer.

During 46 years of artistic activity, Abdollahi received numerous awards from various festivals and was paid tributes by his colleague and also Iranian universities.

Works

Awards and honors

Gallery

References 

1955 births
2015 deaths
Iranian male actors
People from Borujerd
Iranian radio actors
Iranian film directors
Iranian male film actors
Iranian theatre directors
Iranian male stage actors
University of Tehran alumni
Iranian television directors
Iranian radio and television presenters